The 16th President and Vice President election of the Republic of China is scheduled to be held in Taiwan on 13 January 2024. Incumbent President Tsai Ing-wen of the Democratic Progressive Party (DPP), who was reelected in 2020, is ineligible to seek a third term. The winner of the 2024 presidential election is scheduled to be inaugurated on 20 May 2024.

Background
Presidential candidates and Vice Presidential running mates are elected on the same ticket, using first-past-the-post voting. This will be the eighth direct election of the president and vice president, the posts having previously been indirectly elected by the National Assembly until 1996.

Under the Article 22 of the Presidential and Vice Presidential Election and Recall Act, the Democratic Progressive Party (DPP), Kuomintang (KMT), Taiwan People's Party (TPP) and New Power Party (NPP), which received more than five per cent of the total vote share in the latest election at any level, are eligible to contest the election. Registration with the Central Election Commission as the candidates for President and Vice President is filed by the way of political party recommendation where a letter of recommendation stamped with the political party’s seal issued by the Ministry of the Interior shall be submitted together with the application. Under Article 23, independent candidates and smaller parties are also eligible to contest, registering as the candidates for President and Vice President by the way of joint signature shall, within five days after the public notice for election is issued, apply to the Central Election Commission for being the presenter recommended by way of joint signature, receive a list of joint signers and to receive 1.5 per cent of the total electors in the latest election of the members of the Legislative Yuan, and pay the deposit of NT$1,000,000.

According to the constitution, the incumbent President, Tsai Ing-wen, who will finish her second full term, is ineligible for re-election.

Nominations

Democratic Progressive Party

Nominated candidate

 Lai Ching-te, Vice President (2020–present); Premier (2017–2019); Mayor of Tainan (2010–2017)

Kuomintang

Potential candidates

Publicly expressed interest
As of February 2023, the following people have publicly expressed interest about potentially pursuing the candidacy.

 Jaw Shaw-kong, Member of the Legislative Yuan (1987–1991, 1993–1996); Minister of the Environmental Protection Administration (1991–1992)
 Chang Ya-chung, Member of the National Assembly (2005)

Other potential candidates
As of February 2023, the following people have been subjects of significant speculation about their potential candidacy.

 Eric Chu, Mayor of New Taipei (2010–2018); Vice Premier (2009–2010); candidate for president in 2016
 Han Kuo-yu, Mayor of Kaohsiung (2018–2020); Member of the Legislative Yuan (1993–2002); candidate for president in 2020
 Hou Yu-ih, Mayor of New Taipei (2018–present); Director-General of the National Police Agency (2006–2008)
 Terry Gou, businessman and former CEO of Foxconn

Declined
The individuals in this section have been the subject of speculation about their possible candidacy, but have publicly denied interest in running.
 Johnny Chiang, Member of the Legislative Yuan (2012–present)
 Lo Chih-chiang, Taipei City Councilor (2018–2022); Deputy Secretary-General of the ROC Presidential Office (2012–2013)

Taiwan People's Party

Potential candidates

Publicly expressed interest
As of February 2023, the following people have publicly expressed interest about potentially pursuing the candidacy.

 Ko Wen-je, Mayor of Taipei (2014–2022)

New Party

Announcement pending
 Wang Chien-shien, President of Control Yuan (2008–2014) (announcement expected in March 29)

Opinion polling

Multiple candidates per party

Single candidate per party

Notes

References

Taiwan
2024